In implant dentistry, the implant-abutment junction (IAJ) refers to the location of intimate contact between a dental implant and its restorative abutment.

The IAJ is a focus of much attention because its morphology and location tend to affect the amount of bone resorption during the initial period of crestal bone changes immediately following implant placement.

See also
 Platform switching

References

Dentistry